Miraj (Pronunciation: [miɾəd͡z]) is a city in Sangli District and also in  Maharashtra, India, that was founded in the early 10th century. It was an important jagir of the Adil Shahi court of Bijapur.

Shivaji Maharaj  stayed in Miraj for two months during his South India Campaign. Because of its location, Miraj has been held as a strategic bastion. It was the capital of Miraj Senior and is an important junction on the central railway network. The Pathwardhan family were the hereditary rulers of Miraj until independence.

The city is part of the Sangli-Miraj-Kupwad Municipal Corporation formed in 1999. The city is recognised for Hindustani classical music and medical services. Miraj is an emerging medical hub in India. The City has an unbelievable doctor patient ratio. Some of the doctors and institutions are well known all over India. Many medical tourists visit from the adjoining districts of North Karnataka and Goa, as well as all over India and from Arab countries. The Ganesha festival is celebrated with great enthusiasm. The annual Ganesh Visarjan procession is an attraction that lasts for an average of twenty hours. Miraj also finds its mention in Ashi Hi Banwa Banwi and popular musical play and movie Katyar Kaljat Ghusli.

History

Early history

Shilahara (1000 to 1216) 
At the end of the 9th century, the Silaharas of Kolhapur gained rule of Miraj.In 1024 AD, Miraj was ruled by Narsimha of the Silahar dynasty. From 1216 to 1316, the Yadavas of Devgiri ruled the town. II (circa 1000-1020 AD), the fourth ruler of Silahar dynasty, appears in the records of his son, Narasimha (circa 1050 to 1075 AD). Jattiga II was succeeded by his son, Gonka who has been described in inscriptions as the conqueror of Karahata (Karhad), Mirinj Miraj and Konkan. The Shilaharas were able to retain the rule of Miraj despite nearby military action by Chavan-raja, the general of Chalukya Jayasirhha II.

Yadavas and Bahmanis (1216 to 1347)
In 1216, Miraj, along with other territories of Silaharas, was conquered by the Yadavas. In 1318, the Bahamanis gained control. Historian, Tazkirat-ul-Mulk, reported that Hasan, the founder of the Bahmani dynasty, was in the employ of the Shaikh Muhammad Junaidi at Gangi near Miraj. Hasan found a treasure with which he raised an army, marched on Miraj. He defeated and imprisoned Rani Durgavati, the subedar of Miraj and captured the town's fort. At the behest of Shaikh Muhammad, the name of the town was changed to Mubarakabad in 1347 (748 Hijri). In 1395, the Bahmanis conquered Miraj. Between 1391 and 1403, Miraj was affected by the Durgadevi famine. From 1423, Malik Imad Ul Mulk ruled Miraj. 1494 was the year of Bahadur Khan Gilani's rebellion. For two months of 1660, Shivaji and Adilshah battled for control of Miraj.

Fortress
The builder of the Miraj fort is unknown. It probably predates the Bahmani sultans, although they may have repaired it and increased its fortifications. They used the fort as a base for military expeditions against South Konkan and Goa. Firishta mentions the fort in an account of the rebellion of Bahadur Gilani in 1494, which was quelled by Sultan Muhammad II (1452–1515). Muhammad II took the fort from its governor, Buna Naik, who acquiesced to the new ruler. Gilani's troops were offered the option of joining Muhammad's army and being treated with leniency or leaving. About 2000 soldiers left the fort to join Gilani's rebel forces. 

Fall of the Bahmani Empire
The power of the Bahmani  rulers waned under the influence of powerful provincial governors. In 1490, the rule of Miraj passed to the Sultanate of Bijapur. During the later years of his reign, Ibrahim Ali Shah I (1534–1558) kept his son, Ali Adil Shah I (1558–1580), under house arrest in Miraj. On Ibrahim's death in 1580, Miraj became a point d' appui (an assembly point) for Ali's troops in his assuming the throne. Subsequently, the troops of Miraj fought with Ismail against Ibrahim Adil Shah III.

Rise of the Maratha Empire
On 28 November 1659, (within 18 days of Afzal Khan's, the Bijapuri sardar's, death at Pratapgad, Panhala), the western Adil Sahi district was surrendered to Annaji Datto (Shivaji's finance minister).  Unlike other towns, the Miraj fort resisted.  Shivaji, who was encamped at Kolhapur, sent Netaji Palkar to besiege Miraj.  In January 1660, Shivaji arrived to personally command the three-month-long ongoing siege.  However, news of attacks by Siddi Johar and Fazal Khan caused his return to Panhala.  The siege of Miraj was abandoned and negotiations began.  Under the rule of Sambhaji, Maratha generals (Santaji Ghorpade and Dhanaji Jadhav) chose Miraj as a safe place for their families while they were conducting guerilla actions against the invading Aurangzeb forces of the Mughal emperor.

Mughals
In 1687, Bijapur fell to the Mughals.  In 1680, Santaji Ghorpade became Deshmukhi of Miraj and six years later, the town was captured by Aurangzeb. In 1730, Chatrapati Shahu of Satara instructed Pant Pratinidhi to attack the town.Miraj remained under Mughal rule until 3 October 1739. On that day, it was captured by
Shahu after a military campaign of two years, reflecting the fall of the last defences of the Mughals. Shahu gains power in Miraj on 3 October 1739 and brings Maratha rule. In 1761, Harbhat Patwardhan's son, Gopalrao, took the Miraj Jagir from Peshwa Madhavrao.

British Raj
The Patwardhan dynasty ruled Miraj as the capital of a principality, overseen by British rule. Miraj was part of the southern division of the Bombay Presidency which in turn was part of the southern Mahratta Jagirs, and later the Deccan States Agency.
In 1820, the state of Miraj was divided into Miraj Senior and Miraj Junior. The territory of both regions was distributed among other native states and British districts. The area of Miraj Senior was 
. In 1901, its population was 81, 467. Its revenue was £23,000 and the tax paid to the British was £800. The population of the town of Miraj in 1901 was 18, 425. It lay on a junction on the Southern Mahratta Railway.

Independence
On 8 March 1948, Miraj Senior acceded to the Dominion of India & Princedom of Miraj becomes part of the Republic of India. At the present day, it is a part of the Maharashtra state.

Climate

Demographics 
As of the 2011 census, the population of the Miraj area is as follows.

Marathi is the official and most widely spoken language of the city. A unique kind of Hindi (Dakhini hyderabadi type) blended with Marathi is also spoken.

Hindustani classical music
Miraj is a popular place for artists to perform at Urus. The administrative office of the Gandharva Mahavidyalaya is at Miraj. The city is known for its finesse in playing and manufacturing Sitars.

Musicians

 Vishnu Digambar Paluskar
 Vishnu Narayan Bhatkhande
 Hirabai Badodekar
 Vinayakrao Patwardhan
 Bal Gandharva made his debut performance at Hans Prabha Theatre, Miraj. In the same location, the Balgandharva Natyagruha was named for him.
 Ustad Abdul Karim Khan, a doyen of the Kirana gharana, lies interred within the Hazrat Khawaja Shamna Mira RH and Hajrat Mira Saheb RH Dargah. An annual music festival at the dargah takes place in his memory.
 Ram Kadam (composer), Marathi Films Musician

String instruments
Miraj supplies Indian string instruments such as the Sitar, Sarod, and Tanpura. These are made of wood and specially treated gourds. The art of instrument making was developed by Faridsaheb Sitarmaker in the 18th century, and his descendants follow this tradition. The small area of Miraj is responsible for creating sitars and are renowned for their craftsmanship. The traditional craft of making this instruments is passed down generation to generation instilling the vitality of the small markets of Miraj.

Transportation

Railway 
Miraj Junction railway station is an important junction on the Central Railway. It was the only junction to have all three rail gauges - broad gauge, narrow gauge and metre gauge. The last narrow gauge train departed on 1 November 2008.  Miraj now has only broad gauge railway tracks. Miraj is connected by railway to Pune on the north, Kurduvadi via Pandharpur on north-northeast and Belgaum and Goa in the south. In February, 2011, passenger trains from Kolhapur to Solapur began running on the converted Miraj-Pandharpur-Kurduvadi broad gauge track.

Prestigious trains of South Western Railways Rani Chennamma Express bound to Bengaluru city originates from Miraj Jn.

Road 
Miraj lies off the Mumbai-Pune-Bangalore highway, NH 48. 
 Exit NH 48 at Peth Naka while driving from north (from Mumbai and Pune).
 Exit NH 48 at Shiroli Naka while driving from south (from Goa, Belgaum or Bangalore).
The two exits from NH 48 form a triangle with Sangli and Miraj which lie about 50 km from each exit. Though the time taken to travel from Miraj is variable, depending on speed and other factors, Mumbai is about 7 hours and Bangalore is about 11 hours drive away.

Bus 
The Maharashtra State Road Transport Corporation operates a bus station a Miraj. Approximately 400 buses are estimated to arrive and depart from the terminus. Buses of the Karnataka State Road Transport Corporation also pass through the bus station. 

Buses bound for Satara, Karad, Belgaum, Kolhapur, Hubli, Ratnagiri, Chiplun, Pune, Palus Sangli, Mahabaleshwar, ichalkaranji, Pandharpur, Tasgaon, Ichalkaranji, Gargoti, Gadhinglaj, Ajara, Shirala, Islampur, Vita, Jath, Wai, Mumbai, Thane,  and Solapur leave from the Miraj ST station.

City Bus 
here Maharashtra State Road Transport Corporation operates a bus station a Miraj city stand. Approximately 100 buses are estimated to arrive and depart from the terminus.

Buses bound for entire Sangli-Miraj-Kupwad city and also Near by villege like Malgaon,Shubhasnagar,Maishal,Vaddi,Dhavali,Khanderajuri,Dongarwadi,Vishrambug,Shirol,Kurundwad,Bhose and many more.

See also 

 Sir William James Wanless - Founder of Wanless Hospital.
 Dargah of Meerasaheb Avalia
Shri Ayyappa Mandir, Miraj
Ambedkar Udyan, Miraj

References

External links 
 The Municipal Corporation home page - Marathi language only as of 2006/10/09
 The List of the rulers of Miraj Senior
 Original article in the district Gazetteer

Cities and towns in Sangli district
Princely states of India
Talukas in Maharashtra